María Román (born January 30, 1982 in Caracas, Venezuela as María Isabel Román Bianchetti) is a Venezuelan actress known for her role in various  Venevisión telenovelas written by renowned writer  Leonardo Padrón and various theater and film productions.

Biography
Marisa began acting at the age of 9 by acting in children's theater. Her first acting role was in the telenovela Así es la vida in 1998 produced by Laura Visconti Productions for Venevisión. Her major breakthrough role came in 2004 where she played the dual role of twins Verónica and Maria Suspiro  in the hit telenovela Cosita Rica written by Leonardo Padrón.

In 2006, she obtained her first protagonist role in the telenovela Ciudad Bendita written by Leonardo Padrón. She would later participate in Leonardo's later telenovelas La vida entera in 2009 and La mujer perfecta in 2010.

After her participation in La mujer perfecta, Marisa moved to Los Angeles in the United States to participate in various film productions and study acting in order to improve on her acting talent.

In 2013, Marisa returned to Venezuela to star as the protagonist of Venevisión's telenovela De todas maneras Rosa.

Apart from her work in telenovelas, Marisa has also participated in various films such as Memorias de un Soldado, The Zero Hour, El Manzano Azul, Elipsis, among others.

Filmography

Telenovelas

Films
 Dia Naranja ( 2009)
The Zero Hour (2010) as Veronica Rojas
Samuel (2011) as Engracia
 Memorias de un Soldado (2012) as Lucia
 El Manzano Azul (2012) as Isabel Adulta
 Cuidado con lo que sueñas (2013)
Translucido ( 2016)
Litlle Square ( TBA)
All my Tomorrow ( TBA)

References

External links
 
MARISA ROMÁN at 
Estrellas:Marisa Román at [www.venevision.net/]

1982 births
Living people
Venezuelan stage actresses
Venezuelan film actresses
Venezuelan telenovela actresses
20th-century Venezuelan actresses
21st-century Venezuelan actresses